Newton Liu or Liu Yaochang (1900–1977) was an Anglican Bishop in China. He was consecrated Bishop of Shensi in the Church of the Holy Nativity Wuchang on 28 October 1947.

References

Anglican missionary bishops in China
20th-century Anglican bishops in China
Anglican bishops of Shensi